The Sahitya Akademi Fellowship is a literary honour in India bestowed by the Sahitya Akademi, India's National Academy of Letters. It is the highest honour conferred by the Akademi on a living writer, the number of fellows at no time exceeding 21.
Elected from among writers thought by the Akademi to be of acknowledged merit, the fellows are sometimes described as the "immortals of Indian literature."

Sarvepalli Radhakrishnan was the first writer elected to the Fellowship; Mulk Raj Anand was the first Indian English writer to be inducted in 1989 and R. K. Narayan in 1994, the second.

History and purpose 
The appointment of Fellows to the Sahitya Akademi was based in part on models of academies of letters, and in particular, on the Académie française's model of honouring literary excellent by electing writers as Members. The initial Constitution of the Academy proposed a limited membership of twenty-one Fellows, who were to be "literary persons of outstanding merit". The first General Committee recommended an expansion in the number of fellows, by including fifty Associate Fellows, as well as five Honorary Fellows. The latter provision was to enable the Akademi to honour foreign writers as well. Despite the inclusion of this provision, the Akademi did not make appointments to the position of Associate Fellows, and in 1999 the provision for their appointment was deleted.

Soon after the death of Jawaharlal Nehru, who was the first President of the Sahitya Akademi, Mulk Raj Anand proposed that Nehru be elected as a Fellow of the Akademi posthumously. This proposal was rejected, and the Akademi took the view that Fellowships would only be conferred upon living writers. The General Council has, as a practice, refrained from electing its own members for the Fellowship, although there have been instances of members of the General Council become fellows after their term on the Council ends. A significant exception to this practice is the appointment of D. Jayakanthan as a Fellow while he was serving on the council.

The first Fellow of the Akademi, S. Radhakrishnan, was elected as Fellow in 1968, fourteen years after the Akademi was constituted. Radhakrishnan had previously served on the Council of the Sahitya Akademi, first as vice-president, and later, as president. He was appointed "in recognition of his outstanding contribution to Indian thought and to the tradition of universal humanism". The first woman to be elected Fellow was Mahadevi Varma, in 1979, . followed by three women writers in 1994 (Malayalam poet Balamani Amma, Bengali novelist and poet Ashapoorna Devi, and Urdu novelist Qurratulain Hyder). Hindi author Krishna Sobti was honoured in 1996, and English novelist Anita Desai in 2009. On 16 February 2016, the Akademi announced the fellowship to Punjabi writer and novelist Gurdial Singh and Bengali poet Nirendranath Chakravarty. , there are only 20 fellows of the Sahitya Akademi.

Appointment of fellowships 
The executive board of the Akademi recommends the names of literary persons to be elected as Fellows and Honorary Fellows to the General Council. The General Council, who operates for the period of five years, holds an authority to elect a fellow based on the recommendation made by the executive board.

The fellowship was established in 1968 and is limited to twenty individuals at any given time. , the fellowship has been conferred on 92 writers.

In 1994, the Akademi began the practice of holding an event called 'Samvad' in which Fellows read from their work, and each reading was followed by discussions with a panel of critics and writers. The participants in the first series included V. B. Kolte (Marathi scholar, writer, and critic), Harbhajan Singh (Punjabi writer and critic) and Nagarjun (Maithili and Hindi poet and novelist).

Fellowships to foreign authors 
In addition to twenty-one fellowships to Indian nationals, the Sahitya Akademi has also instituted three fellowships to international writers and scholars.

Honorary fellowships 
The Sahitya Akademi's Constitution provides for the appointment of 'Honorary Fellows' of the Akademi "from among literary persons of outstanding merit who are not nationals of India". The number of such fellowships is limited to ten individuals at any given time, an increase from the original provision for five fellows. The first Honorary Fellow of the Akademi was appointed in 1974: the poet, the first President of Senegal, and theorist of Négritude Léopold Sédar Senghor. The citation provided to him records that "Senghor is one of the leading literary figures of the African continent. As a linguist he has been working to establish links between Dravidian, Sumerian, ancient Egyptian and African languages..." In his acceptance speech, Senghor described himself as an "old admmirer of the Indian Civilisation," emphasizing his fondness for the poetry of Indian poet Rabindranath Tagore.

Other Honorary Fellows of the Akademi include American linguist and Indologist Edward C. Dimock; American professor of Sanskrit, Daniel Henry Holmes Ingall; Czech scholar of Dravidian studies, Kamil Vaclav Zvelebil; Chinese professor of Indian literature and translator, Ji Xianlin; Greek diplomant, scholar and poet, Vassilis Vitsaxis; and Russian academic and scholar of Indian history, Evgeni Petrovich Chelyshev.

The most recent recipient of the fellowship is a Mauritian poet, novelist Abhimanyu Unnuth who was awarded in the year 2013. , nine individuals have been elected as honorary fellows.

Ananda Coomaraswamy Fellowship 
Named after a Sri Lankan Tamil philosopher Ananda Coomaraswamy, the "Ananda Coomaraswamy Fellowship" was instituted in 1996 and is offered to "a person of eminence in the field of Asian art, culture, literature and language studies" from Asian countries to pursue literary projects. It was announced on three individuals, Sri Lankan Archaeologist Senake Bandaranayake, Japanese author and anthropologist Chie Nakane, and Uzbekistani professor Azad N. Shamatov. The fellowship was discontinued after its first conferral and was revived in 2005 but no conferment has been made since then.

Premchand Fellowship 
The "Premchand Fellowship" is instituted in 2005 and is named after Hindi writer Premchand, who is popularly known as "Munshi Premchand", during his 125th Birth Anniversary. It is given to "a person of eminence in the field of culture and literature" doing research on Indian literature or to creative writers from the South Asian Association for Regional Cooperation (SAARC) countries other than India. The first and sole recipient of the fellowship is a Pakistani national and Urdu writer Intizar Hussain. The period of Fellowship for "Ananda Coomaraswamy Fellowship" and "Premchand Fellowship" ranges from one month to three months depending on the convenience and availability of the recipient. The visiting Fellow needs to submit a comprehensive report of their visit which is to be placed before the executive board and are requested to deliver lectures on the topic of their specialization in universities and institutions dealing in the discipline.

List of fellows

See also
 List of Sangeet Natak Akademi fellows
 List of Lalit Kala Akademi fellows
 Jnanpith Award, annual literary award conferred by the Bharatiya Jnanpith.

Explanatory notes

References

Bibliography

External links

 

Indian literary awards
Awards established in 1968
Recipients of the Sahitya Akademi Fellowship
Sahitya Akademi
Sahitya Akademi
1968 establishments in India
Lists of members of learned societies